Gold Rush: White Water is a reality television series that airs on the Discovery Channel.  A spin-off of Gold Rush, the series follows placer gold miners "Dakota" Fred Hurt and his son Dustin Hurt, returning to the wilderness of Haines Borough, Alaska, seeking their fortune by suction dredge diving within its raging whitewater creeks.

On October 10, 2019, it was announced that the third season would premiere on November 8, 2019. On October 23, 2020, it was announced that the fourth season would premiere on November 13, 2020.

Cast

Current cast

Minor/former cast members

Episodes

Series overview

Season 1

Season 2

Season 3

Season 4

Season 5

Season 6

Locations
Haines Borough, Alaska, United States (seasons 1–6)
The Trifecta Claim (McKinley Creek, Chilkat Range, Alaska, United States; seasons 1–2; season 4) — owned by Dustin Hurt
Cahoon Creek Claim (Chilkat Range; season 2) — owned by Dustin Hurt
Two Fish Claim – Thunder Falls (Cahoon Creek, Chilkat Range; season 3) — owned by "Dakota" Fred Hurt
Rainbow's End Claim (Cahoon Creek, Chilkat Range; season 3) — owned by Dustin Hurt
Rockfall Ravine Claim (The Nugget Bowl – The Chute – The Dog Leg) (McKinley Falls, McKinley Creek, Chilkat Range; seasons 3–5) — owned by Dustin Hurt
House Rock Claim (McKinley Creek, Chilkat Range; season 5) — owned by Dustin Hurt
Golden Gates Claim (Nugget Creek, Chilkat Range; season 6) — owned by Dustin Hurt
Upper Porcupine Creek Claim (Porcupine Creek, Chilkat Range; season 6) — owned by Mark Siethen
Upper Nugget Creek Claim (Chilkat Range; season 6) — owned by Dustin Hurt
McKinley Camp
McKinley Creek, Chilkat Range, Alaska, United States (seasons 1–5)
Porcupine Creek Mine Base Camp
Porcupine Creek, Chilkat Range, Alaska, United States (seasons 1–6)
High Camp
Chilkat Range, Alaska, United States (season 3)
Nugget Creek Base Camp
Tsirku River, Chilkat Range, Alaska, United States (season 6)
Haines, Alaska, United States (seasons 1–6)
Valdez, Alaska, United States (season 5)
Mineral Creek Claim (Chugach Census Area, Alaska, United States; season 5)
Fairplay, Colorado, United States (season 1)
Medford, Oregon, United States (season 4)

See also
Gold mining in Alaska
Yukon Gold, a cancelled reality TV series with placer gold mining in the Cassiar and Atlin districts of British Columbia and the Klondike, Yukon.

References

External links

2010s American reality television series
2018 American television series debuts
Adventure reality television series
American adventure television series
Gold mining in the United States
Television shows set in Alaska
American television spin-offs
Reality television spin-offs